WWPI-LD (channel 16) is a low-power television station licensed to Fort Kent, Maine, United States, serving the Presque Isle, Maine area as an affiliate of NBC. It is owned by Gray Television alongside CBS/Fox/CW+ affiliate WAGM-TV (channel 8). The two stations share studios on Brewer Road in Presque Isle, where WWPI-LD's transmitter is also located.

WWPI-LD is the only NBC affiliate in Maine not tied in with the Tegna-owned News Center Maine network (consisting of WCSH in Portland and WLBZ in Bangor). Prior to WWPI's sign-on as an NBC affiliate, WLBZ served as the default affiliate for Aroostook County.

History
On June 3, 2019, Gray Television changed the call letters of W16DA-D in Fort Kent, previously a translator of WAGM-TV, to WWPI-LD, after having filed with the FCC on May 21 for a construction permit to move the translator's city of license from Fort Kent to Presque Isle (the FCC granted that CP on August 7); WWPI-LD then fell silent. On June 24, 2019, Gray announced that WWPI-LD would be converted into an NBC affiliate by the end of 2019; however, this was delayed pending completion of the station's new transmitter. The station officially signed-on January 7, 2020, which leaves ABC as the only network to not have an over-the-air affiliate in Presque Isle; that network's programming is carried on cable via WVII-TV from the adjacent Bangor market.

News operation
WWPI-LD mostly simulcasts all of WAGM-TV's weekday newscasts, airing the 6 p.m. newscast an hour later at 7 p.m. WWPI-LD does not air newscasts on weekends, opting for syndicated programming.

Subchannel

References

External links

Low-power television stations in the United States
NBC network affiliates
WPI-LD
Gray Television